Skaggs may refer to:

Skaggs Companies, predecessors to many famous United States retailing chains, including Safeway, Albertsons, Osco, and Longs Drug Stores
Skaggs family, a family prominent in merchandising
Skaggs School of Pharmacy, the pharmacy school of the University of California, San Diego

People 
Charlie Skaggs (born 1965), American professional wrestler best known as 2 Cold Scorpio
Dave Skaggs (born 1951), former Major League Baseball catcher
David Skaggs (born 1943), Democratic Congressman from the state of Colorado
David Curtis Skaggs, Jr. (born 1937), American historian
Hazel Ghazarian Skaggs (1920-2005) American author and composer
Henry Skaggs, American hunter, explorer and pioneer
Jim Skaggs (born 1940), former professional American football offensive lineman
Jimmie F. Skaggs (1944–2004), American actor
Joey Skaggs (born 1945), American prankster who organizes media pranks
Justin Skaggs (1979–2007), American football player
Luther Skaggs, Jr. (1923–1976), United States Marine during World War II
Marion Barton Skaggs (1888–1976), American businessman
Ricky Skaggs (born 1954), Grammy-winning country and bluegrass singer, musician, producer, and composer
Trent Skaggs (born 1973), businessman
Tyler Skaggs (1991–2019), American baseball player
William H. Skaggs (1861–1947), American politician

See also 
Scaggs (disambiguation)